Heilbach is a municipality in the district of Bitburg-Prüm, in Rhineland-Palatinate, western Germany.

References

External links
TV portrait of Heilbach broadcast by Südwestrundfunk 

Bitburg-Prüm